Nicholas Carr or Nick Carr may refer to:

 Nicholas Carr (professor) (1524–1568), British professor
 Nicholas G. Carr (born 1959), American writer
 Nikos Karvelas (born 1951), Greek singer-songwriter and record producer, stage name Nick Carr
 Nick Carr (album), a 1985 album

See also
 Wooda Nicholas Carr (1871–1953), Democratic member of the U.S. House of Representatives from Pennsylvania